East London is the northeastern part of London, United Kingdom. Located east of the ancient City of London and north of the River Thames as it begins to widen, East London developed as London's docklands and the primary industrial centre. The expansion of railways in the 19th century encouraged the eastward expansion of the East End of London and a proliferation of new suburbs. The industrial lands of East London are today an area of regeneration, which are well advanced in places such as Canary Wharf and ongoing elsewhere.

History

Toponymy
The etymology of London is uncertain, but is known to be an ancient name. The concept of East London as a distinct area is a relatively recent innovation. John Strype's map of 1720 describes London as consisting of four parts: The City of London, Westminster, Southwark and That Part Beyond the Tower. From the late 19th century the term East End of London was used to describe areas immediately adjacent to the City in the Tower division of Middlesex. Charles Booth in 1889 defined East London as the County of London between the City of London and the River Lea. In 1902 he now considered this area to be the "true East End", and his attention had been drawn eastward over the Lea into the Borough of West Ham, which was then outside London, and geographically in Essex, but under the authority of neither; in 1857 Charles Dickens termed it "London-over-the-Border". Walter Besant described East London as an area north of the Thames and east of the City of London that stretched as far as Chingford and Epping Forest, which was similar to the definition used by Robert Sinclair in 1950 that stretched east to include Barking and Dagenham. This broadly matched the Metropolitan Police District east of the city and north of the Thames at that time, and now corresponds to the boroughs of Barking and Dagenham, Hackney, Havering, Newham, Redbridge, Tower Hamlets and Waltham Forest in Greater London.

Emergence

The East End of London, the old core of modern East London, began with the medieval growth of London beyond the city walls, along the Roman roads leading from Bishopsgate and Aldgate, and also along the river. Growth was much slower in the east, and the modest extensions there were separated from the much larger suburbs in the west by the marshy open area of Moorfields adjacent to the wall on the north side, which discouraged development in that direction. Urbanisation accelerated in the 16th century and the area that would later become known as the East End began to take shape.

Growth
Until about 1700, London did not extend far beyond the walled boundaries of the City of London. However, the population in the parishes to the east of the City of London was rising and this led to a need to break up the large ancient parish of Stepney into smaller units to provide adequate religious and civil administration. It was the industries associated with the River Thames, such as shipbuilding and the docks, that encouraged growth in the east, and by 1650, Shadwell was a developed maritime settlement. The docks in Tower Hamlets started to reach capacity in the early 19th century, and in 1855 the Royal Victoria Dock was opened in Newham. By 1882, Walter Besant and others, were able to describe East London as a city in its own right, on account of its large size and social disengagement from the rest of London.

Railway expansion
The majority of the rail network in East London was built within fifty years from 1839. The first through the area was the Eastern Counties Railway from Mile End to Romford, extended to Shoreditch in 1840. The London and Blackwall Railway built a line from Minories to Blackwall the same year and the Northern and Eastern Railway connected Lea Bridge and Tottenham with the Eastern Counties at Stratford. The Eastern Counties and Thames Junction Railway started passenger service on their line from Stratford to Canning Town, Custom House and North Woolwich in 1847. This made Stratford a significant railway junction and location of railway works. The East & West India Docks & Birmingham Junction Railway connected Kingsland with Bow and Poplar in 1850 and was renamed North London Railway in 1853.

In 1854 the London, Tilbury and Southend Railway connected Forest Gate on the Eastern Counties with Barking and Rainham. The East London Railway was opened in 1869. The Great Eastern Railway connected Lea Bridge with Walthamstow in 1870, and in 1872 built a connection from the Eastern Counties line at Bethnal Green to Hackney Downs. This was connected to the Walthamstow line in 1873 and extended to Chingford. The London and Blackwall built an extension to Millwall and North Greenwich on the Isle of Dogs in 1872 and the Eastern Counties and Thames Junction Railway was extended to Beckton in 1873, and Gallions in 1880. The London, Tilbury and Southend Railway connected Barking with Dagenham, Hornchurch and Upminster in 1885, and Romford with Upminster in 1893. The final piece of original railway works was the construction of the Great Eastern loop line to connect Woodford with Ilford via Fairlop in 1903.

Areas further east developed in the Victorian and Edwardian eras after the expansion of the railways in the 19th century. Development of suburban houses for private sale was later matched by the provision of large-scale social housing at Becontree in the 1920s and Harold Hill after the Second World War. However, the urban footprint was constrained in 1878 by the protection of Epping Forest and later the implementation of the Metropolitan Green Belt. The density of development increased during the interwar period, and new industries developed, such as Ford at Dagenham.

Industrial decline and regeneration
The industries declined in the later part of the 20th century (and earlier), but East London is now an area of regeneration. London Docklands was defined in the 1980s as the area of redevelopment under the control of the London Docklands Development Corporation. The Thames Gateway extends into East London with two areas of activity: the Lower Lea Valley around the Olympic site and London Riverside adjacent to the Thames.

Governance

There are seven London boroughs that cover areas of Greater London to the north of the Thames and east of the City of London. They are Barking and Dagenham, Hackney, Havering,	Newham,	Redbridge, Tower Hamlets and Waltham Forest. Each London borough is governed by a London borough council local authority. Barking and Dagenham, Hackney, Havering, Newham and Redbridge are members of the East London Waste Authority. Some local government functions are held by the Greater London Authority, made up of the Mayor of London and the London Assembly.

Geography

East London is located in the lower Thames valley. The major rivers of East London are the Thames that forms the southern boundary; the Lea which forms the boundary of Tower Hamlets/Hackney with Newham/Waltham Forest; the Roding which approximately forms the boundary of Newham with Barking and Dagenham/Redbridge; and the Beam which forms the boundary of Barking and Dagenham with Havering. The marshes along the Thames which once stretched from Wapping to Rainham are almost completely gone. East London is generally the lowest elevated of London's four cardinal points because of the wide Thames that runs here; the only hills here are in northern areas distant from the river in the boroughs of Havering, Redbridge and Waltham Forest.

Demography

In Tower Hamlets, the population peaked in 1891 and growth was restricted to the outer boroughs. By 1971 the population was declining in every borough. By the 2011 United Kingdom census, this had reversed and every borough had undergone some growth in population. At the 2021 census Barking and Dagenham, Havering and Redbridge surpassed their earlier population peaks. The total population of this area in 2021 was 1.9 million people. The population change between 1801 and 2021 was as follows:

Transport

River crossings
The City of London and West London are connected to South London by more than thirty bridges, but East London is only connected by Tower Bridge at its innermost edge. The reasons for this include the widening of the River Thames as it gets further east, and also the need, until relatively recently, to avoid impediments to the river traffic of the strategic London Docklands. Until the end of the 20th century the East was connected to the South by just one railway line, the East London Line. The Jubilee Line Extension opened in 1999, was supplemented by extensions to the Docklands Light Railway and the Elizabeth line. A cable car service opened in 2012. There are road tunnels at Rotherhithe and Blackwall, with the Woolwich Ferry further east.  There are also foot tunnels to Greenwich and Woolwich.

Notes

References

External links 
 

Areas of London
Geography of the London Borough of Barking and Dagenham
Geography of the London Borough of Hackney
Geography of the London Borough of Havering
Geography of London
Geography of the London Borough of Newham
Geography of the London Borough of Tower Hamlets
Geography of the London Borough of Waltham Forest
London sub-regions